= Yemeni Identity Card =

Official identity document in Yemen

Yemeni ID Card
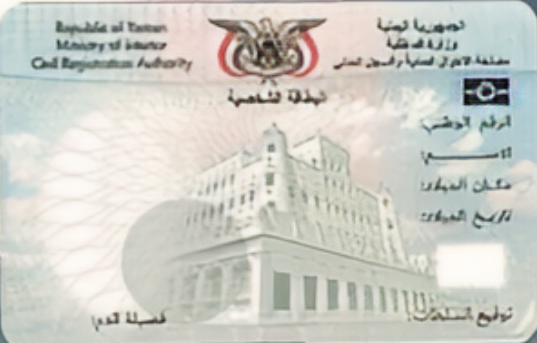
- The biometric variant of the ID card

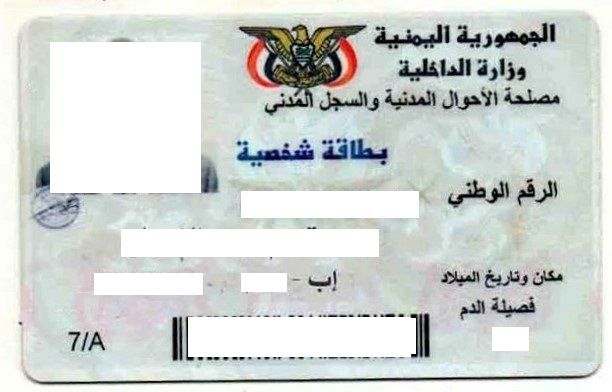
- The non-biometric ID card variant still being issued in most of Yemen
- Type: Identity card
- Issued by: Yemen

A Yemeni Identity Card is an official document issued by the Yemeni government to its citizens. It acts as proof of identity for someone who holds it.

== Smart ID cards ==
The Yemeni embassy in Riyadh has launched a new program offering smart cards to Yemeni citizens abroad. These cards, equipped with biometric security features, aim to improve efficiency in government interactions and data management. This initiative follows a 2009 European Union proposal for a similar identity card system, which was ultimately rejected. Yemeni residents in Saudi Arabia can now schedule appointments online to obtain their smart cards through a process similar to passport issuance. Issuance of the Smart ID card has also began in Aden, however as of 2024, most governmental offices in Yemen still issue the previous, non-biometric ID card.

== Historical versions ==
National ID for citizens of South Yemen
